Damian Copeland (born October 17, 1990) is an American football wide receiver who is currently a free agent. He played college football at the University of Louisville and was signed by the Jacksonville Jaguars as an undrafted free agent in 2014.

High school career
Copeland attended Palmetto High School in Palmetto, Florida. During his senior year, he caught 52 passes for 718 yards and 11 TDs. He received All-Area honors and was an All-State selection.

He was considered a two-star recruit by Rivals.com.

College career
Copeland attended the University of Louisville. During his career he played in 34 games and had 116 receptions for 1521 yards and 7 touchdowns.

Professional career

Predraft

Jacksonville Jaguars
Copeland was signed by the Jacksonville Jaguars on July 18, 2014 after going undrafted in the 2014 NFL Draft. He suffered a wrist injury and was placed on injured reserve on August 4, 2014.

On August 24, 2015, Copeland was waived/injured by the Jaguars. After going unclaimed, he was placed on injured reserve.

Detroit Lions 
On June 7, 2016, Copeland signed to the Detroit Lions.

References

External links
Louisville Cardinals Bio
Jacksonville Jaguars Bio

Living people
1990 births
Sportspeople from Bradenton, Florida
Players of American football from Florida
American football wide receivers
Louisville Cardinals football players
Jacksonville Jaguars players
Detroit Lions players